Frank J. Thomas (1936–2019) was an American photographer, typographer, and printer. In 1959 he and his wife Phyllis founded Tenfingers Press in Los Angeles, out of "a desire to print and publish small books for a limited public."  Their output over the next 21 years was eclectic, ranging from literary epigrams done in whimsical typography to miniature books to a history of California cattle brands.

References

American typographers and type designers
American printers
Private press movement
Private press movement people
1936 births
2019 deaths